Late Night Tales Presents Version Excursion - Selected by Don Letts is a DJ mix album curated by British DJ Don Letts for Late Night Tales series, released by Night Time Stories on 24 September 2021. It features cover songs by reggae/dub artists such as Dennis Bovell, John Holt, Ash Walker, Cornell Campbell, Khruangbin, Mad Professor, Will Holland, Gentleman's Dub Club, and The Tamlins of music by artists from a wide range of eras and genres, such as The Beach Boys, The Beatles, Nina Simone, Marvin Gaye, The Bee Gees, Kool & The Gang, The Clash, and Joy Division, among many others.<ref name="djmag/"

Reception
Sam Easterbook of Buzz wrote about the album, "While it can veer into novelty, the mix is immaculate and is packed with exclusives. Bit of a shame it didn’t come out at the start of the summer really."

Track listing

References

External links
 Late Night Tales Presents Version Excursion - Selected by Don Letts at Light Night Tales
 Late Night Tales Presents Version Excursion - Selected by Don Letts at Discogs

Version Excursion
2021 compilation albums